Gametis versicolor is a species of flower chafer found in Asia. The species normally visits flowers on which it feeds and may pollinate a few species. The species has been reported as causing economic damage in cotton, millets, lentils, and oilseed cultivation in India. It is also known from the Seychelles Islands.

References 

Cetoniinae
Insect pests of millets